Gatesville High School is a public high school located in the city of Gatesville, Texas, United States and  as a  5school by the UIL. It is a part of the Gatesville Independent School District located in central Coryell County. In 2015, the school was rated "Met Standard" by the Texas Education Agency.

Athletics
The Gatesville Hornets compete in the following sports:

 Baseball
 Basketball
 Cross Country
 Football
 Golf
 Powerlifting
 Soccer
 Softball
 Tennis
 Track & Field
 Volleyball

State championships
2000 - Football(3A/D1) 
2009 - Boys golf (3A)

Notable alumni
 Myrtis Coltharp (1900–1993), foreign service nurse
 Cotton Davidson (born 1931), former AFL and NFL quarterback
 Margaret Royalty Edwards (1895-1969), Poet Laureate of Texas 1957-1959
 Taurean Henderson (born 1983), former NFL football player with the Atlanta Falcons and Minnesota Vikings

References

External links
Gatesville ISD website

Public high schools in Texas
Schools in Coryell County, Texas